Cham Davud (also Romanized as Cham Dāvūd; also known as Cham-e Dāvūd Chenār and Chenār) is a village in Teshkan Rural District, Chegeni District, Dowreh County, Lorestan Province, Iran. At the 2006 census, its population was 519, in 112 families.

References 

Towns and villages in Dowreh County